Carolin Schiewe (born 23 October 1988) is a German football midfielder. She plays for SC Freiburg.

Career
Norn in Berlin, Schiewe began her career at Rot-Weiß Groß Glienecke. She joined the academy of 1. FFC Turbine Potsdam in 2001. Her first titles were the German girls championship in 2003, 2004 and 2005. In 2004, she won the World under 19 championship before winning the European under 19 championship in 2006 and 2007.

She became a member of Turbines first team in 2005 and won both the championship and the cup in 2006. She also captained Potsdam to UEFA Cup and UEFA Champions League titles.

After five seasons with FF USV Jena, Schiewe joined rivals SC Freiburg.

References

External links
 Official homepage of 1. FFC Turbine Potsdam

1988 births
Living people
German women's footballers
1. FFC Turbine Potsdam players
FF USV Jena players
SC Freiburg (women) players
Footballers from Berlin
Women's association football midfielders
Frauen-Bundesliga players